, provisionally known as , is a temporary quasi-satellite of Neptune. Observed from Neptune, it would appear to go around it during one Neptunian year but it actually orbits the Sun, not Neptune.

Discovery, orbit and physical properties
 was discovered by the Palomar Distant Solar System Survey on September 9, 2007, with precovery images from 1988 (also taken at Palomar). At the time of discovery, this minor body was believed to be a Neptune trojan, but it is no longer listed as such. The Jet Propulsion Laboratory classifies  as trans-Neptunian object but
the Minor Planet Center includes the object among centaurs. It moves
in an orbit with an inclination of 36.2°, a semi-major axis of 30.18 AU, and an eccentricity of 0.3020. Herschel-PACS observations indicate that it has a diameter of 247 km.

Quasi-satellite dynamical state and orbital evolution
 is currently following a quasi-satellite loop around Neptune. It has been a quasi-satellite of Neptune for about 12,500 years and it will remain in that dynamical state for another 12,500 years. Prior to the quasi-satellite dynamical state,  was an  trojan and it will go back to that state soon after leaving its current quasi-satellite orbit. Its orbital inclination is the largest among known Neptune co-orbitals. It is also possibly the largest known object trapped in the 1:1 mean-motion resonance with any major planet.

Origin
 is a dynamically hot (both, high eccentricity and inclination) object that is
unlikely to be a primordial Neptune co-orbital. It probably originated well beyond Neptune and was
later temporarily captured in the 1:1 commensurability with Neptune.

See also 
 , which was also suspected of being a Neptune trojan at the time of discovery

References

External links 
 MPEC 2007-X06, Minor Planet Electronic Circular (1 December 2007)
  Precovery Images
 

309239
309239
309239
20070909